Mineiro is a Brazilian Portuguese language accent.

Mineiro may also refer to:

 Demonym of Minas Gerais state, Brazil
 Campeonato Mineiro, a Brazilian football (soccer) competition
 Campeonato Mineiro Módulo II, a Brazilian football (soccer) competition
 Campeonato Mineiro Segunda Divisão, a Brazilian football (soccer) competition
 Clube Atlético Mineiro, a Brazilian association football club from Belo Horizonte, Minas Gerais
 Mineiros Esporte Clube, a Brazilian association football club from Mineiros, Goiás
 Mineiro (basketball player) (born 1988), a Brazilian basketball player (center)
 Mineiro (footballer, born 1969), Marcio dos Santos Silva, Brazilian football midfielder
 Mineiro (footballer, born 1975), Carlos Luciano da Silva,  Brazilian football defensive midfielder
 Mineiro (footballer, born 1981), Huenes Marcelo Lemos, Brazilian football defender